Duas Igrejas (Mirandese: Dues Eigreijas) is a civil parish in the municipality of Miranda do Douro, Portugal.

The population in 2011 was 599, in an area of 49.26 km².

Population

References

Freguesias of Miranda do Douro